Frank Frederick Fagan,  (born c. 1944) is a Canadian businessman and dignitary, who served as the 13th  lieutenant governor of Newfoundland and Labrador from 2013 to 2018. He was appointed by Governor General of Canada David Lloyd Johnston on the advice of Prime Minister Stephen Harper on 2 February 2013. Fagan was sworn in on 19 March 2013, succeeding John Crosbie. He is the viceregal representative of Queen Elizabeth II of Canada in the Province of Newfoundland and Labrador.

A telecommunications executive with Bell Aliant, Fagan retired in 2008. He received a Bachelor of Arts degree in 1979 and a Masters of Business Administration in 1982 from Memorial University of Newfoundland.

In 2011, Fagan was made a Member of the Order of Canada "for his contributions as a volunteer, community leader and philanthropist." He was invested as Chancellor of the Order of Newfoundland and Labrador upon his appointment as Lieutenant Governor.

His term of office came to the end on May 3, 2018.

Coat of arms
Fagan was granted the following armorial bearings in April 2015:

References

Living people
Lieutenant Governors of Newfoundland and Labrador
Members of the Order of Canada
Memorial University of Newfoundland alumni
1945 births
21st-century Canadian politicians
Members of the Order of Newfoundland and Labrador